

Etruscan  may refer to:

Ancient civilization
The Etruscan language, an extinct language in ancient Italy
Something derived from or related to the Etruscan civilization
Etruscan architecture
Etruscan art
Etruscan cities
Etruscan coins
Etruscan history
Etruscan mythology
Etruscan numerals
Etruscan origins
Etruscan society
Etruscan terracotta warriors

Biological taxa
 Etruscan bear (Ursus etruscus), a prehistoric ancestor of the brown bear
Etruscan honeysuckle (Lonicera etrusca)
Etruscan shrew (Suncus etruscus), the world's smallest mammal by mass

Other uses
The Etruscan, a novel
Etruscan Press, a publisher
Etruscan Resources, a mining company

See also
Etrurian (disambiguation)
Toscano (disambiguation)
Tuscan (disambiguation)
Tuscany (disambiguation)

Language and nationality disambiguation pages